Philadelphia Daily News is a tabloid newspaper that serves Philadelphia, Pennsylvania. The newspaper is owned by The Philadelphia Inquirer, LLC, which also owns Philadelphia's other major newspaper The Philadelphia Inquirer.

The Daily News began publishing on March 31, 1925, under founding editor Lee Ellmaker. By 1930, the newspaper's circulation exceeded 200,000, but by the 1950s the news paper was losing money. In 1954, the newspaper was sold to Matthew McCloskey and then sold again in 1957 to publisher Walter Annenberg.

In 1969, Annenberg sold the Daily News to Knight Ridder. In 2006 Knight Ridder sold the paper to a group of local investors. The Daily News has won the Pulitzer Prize three times.

History
Philadelphia Daily News began publishing on March 31, 1925, under founding editor Lee Ellmaker. In its early years, it was dominated by crime stories, sports and sensationalism. By 1930, daily circulation of the morning paper exceeded 200,000. Circulation dropped over the years, and by 1954, the money-losing paper was sold to Matthew McCloskey, a contractor and treasurer of the Pennsylvania Democratic Party. In December 1956, the paper's financial condition was so bad that McCloskey got permission from the unions for a 90 percent cut in the workforce.

In 1957, McCloskey sold the paper to Walter Annenberg, publisher of The Philadelphia Inquirer. Annenberg killed off the Daily News' Sunday edition and made the tabloid into an afternoon paper.

In 1969, Annenberg sold both papers to Knight Newspapers Inc., which eventually became Knight Ridder following a merger. Under the new ownership, the Daily News returned to morning publication and aimed to be taken more seriously. The paper's journalists have won the Pulitzer Prize three times. Richard Aregood won in 1985 for editorial writing, Signe Wilkinson won for her editorial cartoons in 1992 and Barbara Laker and Wendy Ruderman won in 2010 for investigating reporting for their "Tainted Justice" series focusing on the alleged misdeeds of a rogue narcotics squad.

The paper continues to struggle financially. It was surpassed in circulation, but not readership, by the free daily Metro. When the sale of Knight Ridder to The McClatchy Company was announced in March 2006, there were rumors that McClatchy would close the Daily News. However, in May, before the sale was finalized, it was announced that the Inquirer and Daily News would be re-sold to Philadelphia Media Holdings L.L.C., a local group led by advertising executive Brian Tierney and co-founder of the Toll Brothers homebuilding firm, Bruce Toll. The deal became official on June 29, 2006. The group intended to strengthen the online presence of both papers, and began an extensive ad campaign.

Falling circulation and ad revenue caused Philadelphia Media Holdings to make the Daily News into an edition of The Philadelphia Inquirer. Without making any other changes to the Daily News, making it part of The Inquirer would combine the circulation numbers of both papers by the Audit Bureau of Circulation. The idea was to make the newspapers more attractive to advertisers. On April 14, 2010 Brian Tierney announced that the Daily News would launch a weekend edition in October. The weekend edition's content would be similar to the daily edition, but would have features that would not be time sensitive and be able to be read anytime during the week.

In early 2009, debts from buying the newspapers forced Philadelphia Newspapers LLC into Chapter 11 bankruptcy protection. The bankruptcy was the beginning of a year-long dispute between Philadelphia Media Holdings and creditors. The group of creditors, which include banks and hedge funds, wanted to take control of Philadelphia Newspapers LLC themselves, and opposed efforts by Philadelphia Media Holdings to keep control. Philadelphia Media Holdings received support from most of the paper's unions and launched a public relations campaign to promote local ownership.

A bankruptcy auction was held on April 28, 2010. The group of lending creditors and a group of local investors allied with Brian Tierney both bid for Philadelphia Newspapers, but the lenders had the winning bid. The lenders' company, Philadelphia Media Network, took control later that year. In July 2012, after selling the Inquirer Building in 2011, the Daily News along with The Inquirer and Philly.com moved their offices to the 3rd floor of the old Strawbridge & Clothier department store on East Market Street.

In 2019, Philadelphia Media Network renamed Philly.com Inquirer.com and made the Daily News an edition of the Inquirer. Philadelphia Media Network was renamed The Philadelphia Inquirer, LLC.

George Fencl Award

The George Fencl Award, named in honor of Philadelphia Police Officer George Fencl, is given by the Daily News to a Philadelphia Police Officer who exemplifies compassion, fairness, and civic commitment.  The award was first given in 1986.

Sportsperson of the Year
The Daily News named its first Sportsperson of the Year in 2008.
2008 – Brad Lidge, Philadelphia Phillies
2009 – Jay Wright, Villanova Wildcats basketball coach
2010 – Roy Halladay, Philadelphia Phillies
2011 – Roy Halladay, Philadelphia Phillies
2012 – Mike Trout, Los Angeles Angels outfielder, born and raised in Millville.

Notable employees
Richard Aregood, 1985 Pulitzer Prize for Editorial Writing
Richie Ashburn, Major League Baseball player, columnist
John Baer, political journalist
Stu Bykofsky, columnist
Pete Dexter, columnist
Ray Didinger, sports columnist
Bill Fleischman, journalist and assistant sports editor
Jay Greenberg, sports writer
Paul Hagen, baseball writer and columnist, 1987–2012;  J. G. Taylor Spink Award recipient 
Stan Hochman, sports columnist
Phil Jasner, sports columnist
Gar Joseph, city editor
Barbara Laker and Wendy Ruderman, 2010 Pulitzer Prize for Investigative Reporting
Larry Merchant, sportswriter, later TV boxing commentator
Alan Richman, food writer
Chuck Stone, columnist, 1972 – 1991
Bascom N. Timmons, in 1944 hired Sarah McClendon as Washington correspondent for the Daily News
Signe Wilkinson, 1992 Pulitzer Prize for Editorial Cartooning

Prices
The Philadelphia Daily News prices are: $2.95 Monday-Saturday, as of 4/1/2019.

References

External links
Philadelphia Daily News Online

1925 establishments in Pennsylvania
Daily newspapers published in Pennsylvania
Newspapers published in Philadelphia
Publications established in 1925
Pulitzer Prize-winning newspapers